Peter Rothmeier Ravn (born 1955) is a Danish painter who has participated in several group exhibitions in Denmark as well as abroad. He has also held several solo exhibitions. 

His primary practice is figurative oil painting, but he has also worked with sculpture and photography. A recurring motif is anonymous men in suits often caught in scenarios that are difficult to decode. 

Among exhibitions are "Di Silvestre/Ravn" at Z2O Galleria Sara Zanin (Rome, Italy, 2010), "Biennale Internazionale dell’Arte Contemporanea" (Brescia, Italy, 2011), "When Men Sleep" at Munkeruphus (2018), "Recovery Position" at Politiken's foyer (2019) and "JAHRESAUSGABEN" in Kunsthalle München (2020). 

Since 2017 Peter Ravn has been represented by Gallery Kant in Copenhagen.

In 2018 the partnership I DO ART Agency made a film about Peter Ravn in connection with the exhibition “When Men Sleep”.

Peter Ravn was educated at Kunstakademiets Arkitektskoles Institute for Design in 1980. A part of his studies were conducted in the United States at Syracuse University (Syracuse, N.Y.) and Parsons School of Design (New York, N.Y.). For many years he worked as a graphic designer. He did record sleeves and music videos for many well known Danish artists, such as Gangway, Laid Back, Kim Larsen and Dizzy Mizz Lizzy.

External links
Peterravn.com Peter Ravn's homepage

References

1955 births
Danish painters
Living people
Syracuse University alumni
Royal Danish Academy of Fine Arts alumni
Parsons School of Design alumni
Place of birth missing (living people)